
Gmina Piekoszów is a rural gmina (administrative district) in Kielce County, Świętokrzyskie Voivodeship, in south-central Poland.

The gmina contains part of the protected area called Chęciny-Kielce Landscape Park.

Villages
Gmina Piekoszów contains the villages and settlements of Bławatków, Brynica, Gałęzice, Górki Szczukowskie, Janów, Jaworznia, Jeżynów, Julianów, Łaziska, Lesica, Łosień, Łosienek, Łubno, Micigózd, Młynki, Piekoszów, Podzamcze, Rykoszyn, Skałka, Szczukowice, Wesoła, Wincentów and Zajączków.

Neighbouring gminas
Gmina Piekoszów is bordered by the city of Kielce and by the gminas of Chęciny, Łopuszno, Małogoszcz, Miedziana Góra, Sitkówka-Nowiny and Strawczyn.

References
Polish official population figures 2006

Piekoszow
Kielce County